The Cheyenne Indians were a minor league baseball team based in Cheyenne, Wyoming. The Cheyenne Indians played as members of the Class D level Rocky Mountain League in 1912 and Western League in 1941, hosting home games at Pioneer Park in both seasons of minor league play.

History
The Cheyenne "Indians" moniker was first used by early amateur and semi–professional teams in Cheyenne, along with other monikers such as the Bachelors,  Benedicts, Black Stockings, Eclipse and Nonpareils. However, the Indians moniker would be used for decades by Cheyenne amateur and semi–professional teams.

The first minor league Cheyenne Indians became members of the short–lived Rocky Mountain League in 1912. The Rocky Mountain League evolved from a semi–professional league and lasted only the 1912 season, permanently folding as a minor league on July 5, 1912. Playing in the four–team 1912 league, the Pueblo, Colorado franchise moved to Trinidad, Colorado on June 8, 1912. Trinidad subsequently moved to Cheyenne on June 28, 1912, becoming the Cheyenne Indians. The Pueblo/Trinidad/Cheyenne franchise was in 1st place with a 22–7 record, 2.5 games ahead of 2nd place Raton, New Mexico when the league folded on July 5, 1912. The Pueblo/Trinidad/Cheyenne managers were John Galena and Ira Bidwell. After the Rocky Mountain League folded, the Cheyenne Indians continued unofficial play against teams from Fort D.A. Russell and Nebraska. The 1912 Indians played home games at Pioneer Park.

In 1941, the Cheyenne Indians became members of the Western League, playing home games at Pioneer Park. The addition of Cheyenne and the Denver Bears allowed the league to expand from four–teams to six–teams in 1941. Cheyenne finished with a 59–44 record, placing 2nd in the Western League under Manager John Kerr. In the regular season standings, Cheyenne finished 2.0 games behind the 1st place Norfolk Yankees and ahead of the Sioux City Cowboys (54–56), Pueblo Rollers (52–54), Sioux Falls Canaries (51–56) and Denver Bears (42–68). In the 1941 Western League Playoffs, the Pueblo Rollers defeated Cheyenne 3 games to 2. The Western League ceased play after the 1941 season due to World War II. When the Western League reformed in 1947, Cheyenne did not field a franchise. The 1941 Indians were the last minor league team in Cheyenne.

The ballpark
The Cheyenne Indians played minor league home games at Pioneer Park in both seasons. Originally built in 1896 with rodeo stands, Pioneer Park had a capacity of 2,000. The 1941 Cheyenne Indians season tickets cost $20 and single game tickets were 40 cents, with single game tickets for soldiers costing 25 cents. Pioneer Park is still in use as a ballpark today. The Pioneer Park location is 1331 Talbot Court, Cheyenne, Wyoming.

Timeline

Year-by-year records

Notable alumni
Bill Evans (1941)
John Kerr (1941, MGR)
George Milstead (1941)

See also
Cheyenne Indians players

References

External link
Baseball Reference

Defunct minor league baseball teams
Sports in Cheyenne, Wyoming
Professional baseball teams in Wyoming
Baseball teams established in 1941
Baseball teams disestablished in 1941
Defunct baseball teams in Wyoming
Defunct Western League teams
Baseball teams established in 1912
Baseball teams disestablished in 1912
1912 establishments in Wyoming
1912 disestablishments in Wyoming
1941 establishments in Wyoming
1941 disestablishments in Wyoming
Rocky Mountain League teams